Back in the Game is an album by Canadian country music artist Chad Brownlee. It was released on June 21, 2019 via Universal Music Canada. It includes the #1 hit "Forever's Gotta Start Somewhere", as well as the singles "Dear Drunk Me" and "The Way You Roll". A deluxe edition featuring the single "Money On You" was released on January 10, 2020.

Track listing (EP)

Track listing (Deluxe Edition)

Charts

Release history

References

2020 albums
Chad Brownlee albums
Universal Music Canada albums
Albums produced by Todd Clark